Di Leo is a surname. Notable people with the surname include:

 Fernando Di Leo (1932–2003), Italian film director and script writer
 Gregorio Di Leo (born 1983), Italian professional Semi-contact kickboxer and member of the Italian National Team
 Jeffrey R. Di Leo, Dean of the School of Arts and Sciences and Professor of English and Philosophy at the University of Houston–Victoria

See also 
 Leo Di, shortform for Leonardo DiCaprio (born 1974), American actor and film producer

Italian-language surnames